Ordnance Cable Factory Chandigarh is a facility under Ordnance Factories Board, Kolkata. It manufactures transmission cables and steel wires mainly for defense and telecommunication sector. Primarily a vendor for Indian Armed Forces, this facility now caters to non-defense industries as well, clients being: Indian Railways, Department of Telecommunications, State Electricity Boards and private industries. It also sells pistols and revolvers.

History
The unit was established in 1963 with technical assistance from SUMITOMO, Japan.

Products
 Field Telephone Cable JWD-1
 Carrier Quad Cable
 Spring Steel Wires
 Air Field Lighting Spares
 Jelly Filled Cable
 Cable Assemblies for T-72 & BMP-II Tanks
 Day Vision Devices of T-72 & BMP-II Tanks

References

External links 
 Official website

Manufacturing companies of India
Firearm manufacturers of India
Defence companies of India
Ministry of Defence (India)
Companies based in Kolkata
1963 establishments in West Bengal
Indian companies established in 1963